Norman A. Chad (born 1958) is an American sportswriter, poker player and syndicated columnist who is seen on the sports channel ESPN. He also was an occasional guest host on the ESPN show Pardon the Interruption and has appeared as both host and movie critic on the ESPN Classic series Reel Classics.

He currently hosts a weekly podcast, Gambling Mad.

He wrote a weekly sports-based column called Couch Slouch, appearing in the Washington Post and several other newspapers, for nearly 20 years. Each column closed with the feature "Ask the Slouch"; if a reader's question was selected, the reader won $1.25 in cash. "Pay the man, Shirley," is frequently cited as a response to readers who have fulfilled the comedy quotient for their particular question.

His biggest comic theme in both sportswriting and poker commentary is his frequent references to his 'failed marriages'. In his weekly syndicated column on July 29, 2007, Chad announced that he has married for a third time and has started a new 'perilous life'. He has regularly made numerous (presumably unpaid) references to his beer preference, which has switched from Rolling Rock to Pabst Blue Ribbon to Yuengling. His poker commentary often includes terms such as "squadoosh" (zero/nothing, e.g., a weak hand) and "whamboozled" (to be knocked out of a tournament). He also utters various humorous phrases whenever he mentions a player's alma mater. The phrase is almost always, "I believe they are the..." finished with an unusual college nickname, such as Demon Deacons or Ragin' Cajuns.

Since 2003, Chad has appeared on most of ESPN's poker broadcasts, including the World Series of Poker and The United States Poker Championship, among other events. Since becoming ESPN's poker analyst, Chad has also participated in 50 World Series of Poker events himself. In both 2009 and 2011, he finished in the money of the $1,500 Stud 8 or better event. At the 2012 World Series of Poker, Chad made the final table of the $2,500 1/2 Omaha 8  1/2 Stud 8 event where he finished in sixth place for $36,093, and in 2014, he finished 10th in the $10,000 Stud 8 or better event for $34,550. In 2020, he also finished in the money in two World Series of Poker online bracelet events.

For 12 years, Chad made NFL predictions against the spread in his syndicated column; Chad picked the winners merely by flipping a coin, and most years ended up with a winning record.

In addition to his work on ESPN and on his Couch Slouch column, Chad wrote a book, published in 1993 by the Atlantic Monthly Press, called Hold On, Honey, I'll Take You to the Hospital at Halftime (Confessions of a TV Sports Junkie). The book is a compilation of Chad's thoughts on ESPN as a sports network, as well as criticism of different sports programs, including Monday Night Football.

Chad has written episodes of Arliss and Coach. He wrote a column for Sports Illustrated in 1992, which he has termed "the worst professional year of my life."

Chad is of Cuban descent on his mother's side. He is a graduate of the University of Maryland, College Park. Prior to attending the University of Maryland, he attended Northwood High School in Silver Spring, Maryland, graduating in 1976.

References

External links
ESPN Media Zone bio
Hendon Mob stats
WSOP.com stats
CardPlayer stats
Norman Chad Poker League
 

1958 births
Living people
American film critics
American columnists
American people of Cuban descent
People from Silver Spring, Maryland
Poker commentators
University of Maryland, College Park alumni
Screenwriters from Maryland
Sportswriters from Maryland